Margarites atlantoides is a species of sea snail, a marine gastropod mollusk in the family Margaritidae.

Description
The height of the shell attains 10 mm.

Distribution
This marine species occurs off the Lesser Antilles at a depth of 500 m.

References

 Quinn, J. F., Jr. 1992. New species of Calliostoma Swainson, 1840 (Gastropoda: Trochidae), and notes on some poorly known species from the Western Atlantic Ocean. Nautilus 106: 77-114

External links
 To Encyclopedia of Life
 To World Register of Marine Species

atlantoides
Gastropods described in 1992